Gharib-e Deylam-e Sofla (also Romanized as Gharīb-e Deylam-e Soflá; also known as Deylam-e ‘Oqāb, Deylam-e Pā’īn, Deylam Oqāb, and ‘Oz̄ayyeb) is a village in Shamsabad Rural District, in the Central District of Dezful County, Khuzestan Province, Iran. At the 2006 census, its population was 100, in 21 families.

References 

Populated places in Dezful County